Elizabeth Marie "Liz" Redfern, Baroness Redfern (born 25 September 1947) is a British Conservative politician and member of the House of Lords.

Early life
She was born in Winterton as Elizabeth Waud. She attended secondary modern school in Winterton, Lincolnshire, which became Winterton Comprehensive School in 1968, then North Lindsey College in Scunthorpe where she studied Arc Welding and Vulcanization.

Career

She became a Conservative councillor on North Lincolnshire Council, at its creation in 1996. She represented the Axholme Central ward until May 2019.

The leader of North Lincolnshire Council, until 15 January 2017, she was created a life peer taking the title Baroness Redfern, of the Isle of Axholme in the County of Lincolnshire on 7 October 2015.

References

External links
Councillor Liz Redfern
Isle of Axholme information site

1947 births
Living people
Conservative Party (UK) councillors
Conservative Party (UK) life peers
Life peeresses created by Elizabeth II
Councillors in the Borough of North Lincolnshire
People from Epworth, Lincolnshire
People from Winterton, Lincolnshire
Leaders of local authorities of England
Women councillors in England